Sarah Mary Malet Bradford (née Hayes; born 3 September 1938) is an English author who is best known for her royal biographies.

Early life and education
Bradford was born in Bournemouth in 1938, the daughter of Brigadier Hilary Anthony Hayes . She was educated at St Mary's School, Shaftesbury, Dorset. She won a State scholarship to Lady Margaret Hall, University of Oxford, but met Anthony Bradford, a real estate developer, at Oxford, and abandoned her degree to marry him. The couple lived in Barbados, Lisbon, and Sardinia; they had two children, but divorced.

Sarah Bradford then worked for the manuscript department of the auctioneer Christie's in London, where she met her second husband, William Maxwell David Ward; the two married in 1976.

Writing career
She began her career as a writer with her first book, The Englishman's Wine, written while she lived in Portugal.  She has now published more than a dozen major works.  Her husband became 8th Viscount Bangor in 1993.  She is fluent in four languages and has travelled extensively.  The couple live in London.  Bradford was interviewed in connection with the 1994 edition of the PBS video The Windsors:  A Royal Family and with the 2007 BBC documentary Gladstone and Disraeli (presented by Huw Edwards), and assisted with the screenwriting for The Borgias, a 2011 television series. In 2012, she was working on a biography of Queen Victoria.

Her books have been translated into at least ten languages.

Biographies
 Cesare Borgia (1976)
 The Borgias (with John Prebble) (1981)
 Disraeli (1982)
 Princess Grace (1984)
 George VI, Weidenfeld and Nicolson, London, 1989, 
 The Reluctant King (American version of George VI)
 Sacheverell Sitwell. Splendours and Miseries (1993)
 Elizabeth: A Biography of Britain's Queen (1996); according to WorldCat, the book is in over 1760 libraries
 America's Queen: The Life of Jacqueline Kennedy Onassis (2000); according to WorldCat, the book is in over 1650 libraries
 Lucrezia Borgia: Life, Love and Death in Renaissance Italy, Viking, 2004, 
 Diana, Penguin Group, London, 2006, ; according to WorldCat, the book is in over 890 libraries
 Queen Elizabeth II: Her Life in Our Times, Penguin, London, 2011,

Other books
 The Englishman's Wine: The Story of Port (1969)
 Portugal and Madeira (1969)
 Portugal (1973)

References

External links
 

1938 births
Living people
Alumni of Lady Margaret Hall, Oxford
Writers from Bournemouth
People educated at St Mary's School, Shaftesbury
20th-century English historians
21st-century English historians
20th-century English biographers
21st-century biographers
20th-century English women writers
21st-century English women writers
British women historians
British women biographers